Doop are a dance music production duo from the Netherlands formed by Ferry Ridderhof and Peter Garnefski, who have also recorded under the name Hocus Pocus and various other project names. They were producers and band members of Peplab.

In 2011, Doop released an EP called The Doop Eepee, produced by Ferry Ridderhof, containing the single "My Chihuahua".

Doop was best known for its eponymous single, "Doop", which reached No. 1 in the UK. The song was influenced by the 1920s Charleston dance and was most remembered for its lyrics, which consisted entirely of the word "doop" scatted over a fast-paced big band sample. In the US, a remix of the track by American house artist David Morales was released.

Under the name Hocus Pocus, the duo were best known for their single "Here's Johnny!", which reached No. 1 in Australia.

Discography

Doop
Albums
 Doop Mania - L'Album des remixes (1994)
 Circus Doop (1995) – NL #74

EPs
 The Doop Eepee (2011)

Singles

Hocus Pocus
Albums
 God Devil Hell Heaven (1997)

Singles

References

Dutch dance music groups
Dutch Eurodance groups
Dutch musical duos
MCA Records artists
Electro swing musicians
Electronic dance music duos